Headmasters may refer to:

Headmaster (Transformers), a toy series
Transformers: The Headmasters an anime series
The Transformers: Headmasters, a comic series